The Curtiss XSB3C was a proposed development by Curtiss-Wright of the Curtiss SB2C Helldiver dive bomber, submitted to meet a U.S. Navy requirement for a new dive bomber to replace the SB2C in service. Considered inferior to the competing Douglas XSB2D and requiring higher grade fuel than was provided on aircraft carriers, the project was cancelled before any aircraft were built.

Design and development
In response to a Navy request for proposals issued on 3 February 1941 for a replacement for the SB2C, Curtiss designed an improved and enlarged version of the Helldiver, which was, at the time, still only in the process of flight testing. A larger tail, revised wing planform and tricycle landing gear distinguished the aircraft from its predecessor, in addition to the provision of heavier armament.

In addition, hardpoints for two  bombs were fitted under the wings. Forward-firing armament proposals were for the aircraft to be fitted with either six .50-calibre machine guns or four 20mm cannon in the wings, while defensive armament was planned to be fitted in a power-operated turret.

Impressed with the inspection of the mockup of the massive aircraft in December 1941, the Navy ordered two prototypes, and parts of the design were tested by the XSB2C-6.

As the project progressed during 1942, however, it was determined to be inferior to the competing Douglas aircraft. This, combined with the aircraft's requirement for 115/145 octane fuel, which was considered difficult to handle aboard ship, and the decision by the Bureau of Aeronautics that future attack aircraft would be single-seat aircraft, led to the Navy's decision to cancel the prototype contract, and no examples of the XSB3C were ever built.

Specifications (XSB3C-1)

See also

References

Citations

Bibliography

 Johnson, E.R. American Attack Aircraft Since 1926. McFarland, 2008. .
 Lawson, Robert and Barrett Tillman. U. S. Navy Dive and Torpedo Bombers of World War II. MBI Publishing, 2001, p. 82-83. .
 Norton, Bill. U.S. Experimental & Prototype Aircraft Projects: Fighters 1939-1945. North Branch, Minnesota: Specialty Press, 2008, p. 111. .

External links
 XSB3C-1 serials

SB03C
Cancelled military aircraft projects of the United States
Single-engined tractor aircraft
Low-wing aircraft
Carrier-based aircraft
World War II dive bombers of the United States